A sleeper is a person who is sleeping.

Sleeper may also refer to:

Arts and entertainment

Characters
 Sleeper (Marvel Comics), a Nazi German robot utilized by the Red Skull in Marvel Comics
 The Sleeper (Wild Cards), a character in the Wild Cards science fiction series who periodically hibernates, awakening each time in a new body

Films
 Sleeper (1973 film), a Woody Allen film
 Sleeper (2005 film), an Austrian/German film
 Sleeper (2012 film), an action/thriller film starring Scott "Raven" Levy and Bruce Hopkins
 The Sleeper (2000 film), a British television crime drama film
 The Sleeper (2012 film), an American horror film

Television
 "Sleeper (Space Ghost Coast to Coast)", an episode of Space Ghost Coast to Coast

Episodes
 "Sleeper" (Buffy the Vampire Slayer), 2002
 "Sleeper" (Modern Family), 2014
 "Sleeper" (Roseanne), 1994
 "Sleeper" (Smallville), 2008
 "Sleeper" (Torchwood), 2008
 "Sleeper", an episode of The New Avengers

Literature
 Sleeper (comics), published by WildStorm/DC Comics
"The Sleeper" (poem), a poem by Edgar Allan Poe

Music

Groups
 Sleeper (band), a Britpop band in the 1990s
 Oh, Sleeper, a metalcore band formed in the 2000s

Albums
 Sleeper (Everyday Sunday album)
 Sleeper (Godstar album), 1993
 Sleeper (Keith Jarrett album), 2012
 Sleeper (Tribe album), 1993
 Sleeper (Ty Segall album), 2013
 The Sleeper, a 2003 Blue Orchids album
 The Sleeper ( album), an album by The Leisure Society

Songs
 "Sleeper", by 10 Years from Minus the Machine, 2012
 "Sleeper", by Erra from Drift, 2016
 "The Sleeper", by Candiria from Kiss the Lie, 2008

Other
 "The sleeper", a yo-yo trick

Biology
 Sleepers or sleeper gobies, the common names for fish belonging to the family Eleotridae
 Freshwater sleeper, family of fish
 Sleeper cichlid, perch-like member of the genus Nimbochromis

Construction
 Sleeper, a strong internal beam in construction and shipbuilding
 Sleeper dike, a low inland dike, made obsolete by a newer dike closer to shore

Fashion
 Sleeper, or Babygrow, a one-piece, often footed sleeping garment for babies and toddlers
 Sleeper earring, originally designed to be worn while sleeping to keep the hole in a pierced ear open
 Sleeper (brand), a Ukrainian fashion brand of multifunctional apparel founded in 2014 by Kate Zubarieva and Asya Varetsa

Transportation
 Sleeper (car), an automobile that has been modified to improve its performance without changing its outward appearance; the British term for this is Q-car
 Sleeping car or sleeper, a railway passenger car with beds
 Sleeper bus, designed to carry fewer passengers in greater comfort
 Truck sleeper, a sleeping compartment behind the cab of a tractor unit
 Railway sleeper, a railroad tie
 Sleeper ship, a hypothetical spacecraft in which the crew hibernates

Other uses
 Sleeper agent, a secret agent or similar operative left long inactive
 Sleeper hit, a work that obtains unexpected recognition or success
 Sleeper, a sleeping partner in business
 Sleeper hold, a rear naked choke hold used in professional wrestling
 Sofa bed, also known as a sleeper sofa
 Bedside sleeper, a baby crib that attaches to the parents' bed 
 Sleeper, Missouri, an unincorporated community in Laclede County, Missouri, United States

See also 
 Sleepers (disambiguation)
 Sleeper (surname)